Jenica Atwin  (née Powell; born January 10, 1987) is a Canadian politician who was elected to represent the riding of Fredericton in the House of Commons of Canada in the 2019 Canadian federal election. Atwin was the first Member of Parliament of the Green Party of Canada to be elected outside of British Columbia and the first woman to be elected in the riding of Fredericton. In June 2021, she crossed the floor from the Green Party to the Liberal Party of Canada, and was re-elected as a Liberal three months later in the 2021 federal election.

Before politics, Atwin was an education consultant and researcher at a First Nations Education Centre.

Early life and education
Jenica Atwin was born Jenica Powell and grew up in Oromocto, New Brunswick. Her father Bob Powell is the mayor of Oromocto. Her stepfather is Ron Tremblay, the Wolastoq Grand Chief. In high school, she was class president.  She completed a Master's in Education at the University of New Brunswick. In 2016, Atwin co-organized a spin-off of We Day focused on introducing First Nations youth to one another and helping those who have recently moved off of reserves. This took place during Atwin's four years as a cultural transition coordinator and researcher with First Nation Education Initiative Incorporated.

Federal politics 
Atwin was elected to represent the riding of Fredericton in the House of Commons of Canada in the 2019 Canadian federal election, defeating incumbent MP Matt DeCourcey. She was the first Member of Parliament of the Green Party of Canada to be elected outside of British Columbia, the first third-party candidate to win the electoral district of Fredericton or its predecessor districts, which have traditionally alternated between Conservative and Liberal Members of Parliament (MPs), and the first woman to be elected in the riding of Fredericton. Along with fellow Green MPs Paul Manly and leader Elizabeth May, Atwin's election created the largest Green caucus ever at three.

In April 2021, Atwin introduced her first private members’ bill, Bill C-285, which would impose a nationwide ban on the use of glyphosate on forests and fields across Canada, stating that the use of glyphosate is a menace to human health, and plant and wildlife diversity.

In May 2021, in response to the 2021 Israel–Palestine crisis, Atwin condemned Israeli airstrikes in the Gaza Strip and called Israel's control of the area apartheid. Atwin also called out Green Party leader Annamie Paul's statement on the conflict calling for de-escalation and more dialogue as "totally inadequate". In response, Paul's senior advisor Noah Zatzman blasted Atwin and fellow Green MP Paul Manly in a May 14 Facebook post, calling their statements regarding the crisis "appalling" and antisemitic, and saying "we will work to defeat you." This followed a statement published on the party website that quoted Paul regarding the crisis, which Atwin responded to with a statement that both reiterated support for the official party policy on the Israeli–Palestinian conflict of expecting MPs to oppose the siege of Gaza and illegal settlements, and described the statement quoting Paul as "totally inadequate".

Atwin subsequently crossed the floor and joined the Liberal Party on June 10, citing lack of support from Paul's leadership after Zatzman's threat. Paul disagreed with this account and commented the events had nothing to do with Zatzman or her; however, Manly and May, the remaining Green MPs, issued a statement stating: "Unfortunately, the attack against Ms. Atwin by the Green Party leader's chief spokesperson on May 14th created the conditions that led to this crisis." On June 14, 2021, shortly after joining the Liberal caucus, Atwin apologized for her earlier remarks, saying that she "regrets her choice of words" and adding: "Palestinians are suffering. Israelis are also suffering as well as their loved ones in Canada and around the world."

Personal life
Atwin placed sixth in a 2010 World Series of Poker Circuit ladies tournament in Louisiana. She is married to Oromocto First Nation band councillor Chris Atwin and has two sons.

Awards 
Atwin was selected as "Rising Star" during Macleans 12th annual Parliamentarians of the Year award.

Electoral record

Federal

Provincial

References

External links

Living people
Green Party of Canada MPs
Liberal Party of Canada MPs
Members of the House of Commons of Canada from New Brunswick
People from Sunbury County, New Brunswick
Politicians from Fredericton
Women members of the House of Commons of Canada
Women educators
21st-century Canadian politicians
21st-century Canadian women politicians
1987 births